Tiberio Muti (1574–1636) was a Roman Catholic cardinal.

Biography
On 15 Jan 1612, he was consecrated bishop by Scipione Caffarelli-Borghese, Archbishop of Bologna, with Fabio Biondi, Titular Patriarch of Jerusalem, and Antonio Ricci, Bishop of Arezzo, serving as co-consecrators.

Episcopal succession

References

1574 births
1636 deaths
17th-century Italian cardinals